Patrick O'Neil (born 31 March 1992) is a Scottish professional footballer who last played as a goalkeeper for Scottish League One side Dumbarton.

Career statistics

References

External links

1992 births
Living people
Scottish footballers
Association football goalkeepers
Brechin City F.C. players
Scottish Professional Football League players
Footballers from Glasgow
Dumbarton F.C. players
Troon F.C. players
West of Scotland Football League players